Rinaldi Firmansyah (born 10 June 1960 in Tanjung Pinang, Riau Islands) is an Indonesian businessman.

Education 
Graduate of Electrical Engineering (Ir), Bandung Institute of Technology in 1985. Master of Business Administration (MBA), IPMI Jakarta. Chartered Financial Analyst (CFA), AIMR, Charlottesville, USA.

Work experiences 
Firmansyah held the position of the CEO of Telkom Indonesia, the main telecommunication company in Indonesia, from 2007 to 2012, before he was Director of Finance. Prior to joining Telkom, he was Commissioner and Head of Audit Committee at PT Semen Padang.

Family 
Firmansyah family came from Solok, West Sumatera. His brother is Erry Firmansyah, was the CEO of the Indonesia Stock Exchange between 2002-2009.

References

External links 
 Rinaldi Firmansyah, CFA, his profile on Telkom Indonesia

Indonesian business executives
Indonesian businesspeople
Minangkabau people
Living people
1960 births
Bandung Institute of Technology alumni
21st-century Indonesian businesspeople